Abbyville is a city in Reno County, Kansas, United States.  As of the 2020 census, the population of the city was 83.

History
Abbyville was a station on the Atchison, Topeka and Santa Fe Railway. The community was named for Abby McLean, the first baby born there; its previous name was Nonpariel. 

The first post office in Abbyville was established in 1886 after it was moved from Salt Creek (an extinct town).

Geography

Climate
The climate in this area is characterized by hot, humid summers and generally mild to cool winters.  According to the Köppen Climate Classification system, Abbyville has a humid subtropical climate, abbreviated "Cfa" on climate maps.

Demographics

2010 census
As of the census of 2010, there were 87 people, 42 households, and 29 families residing in the city. The racial makeup of the city was 96.6% White, 1.1% Native American, and 2.3% from two or more races. Hispanic or Latino people of any race were 1.1% of the population.

There were 42 households, of which 28.6% had children under the age of 18 living with them, 61.9% were married couples living together, 7.1% had a female householder with no husband present, and 31.0% were non-families. 28.6% of all households were made up of individuals, and 9.6% had someone living alone who was 65 years of age or older. The average household size was 2.07 and the average family size was 2.52.

The median age in the city was 53.5 years. 19.5% of residents were under the age of 18; 4.5% were between the ages of 18 and 24; 12.6% were from 25 to 44; 40.2% were from 45 to 64, and 23% were 65 years of age or older. The gender makeup of the city was 54.0% male and 46.0% female.

2000 census
As of the census of 2000, there were 128 people, 47 households, and 36 families residing in the city. The racial makeup of the city was 97.66% White, and 2.34% from two or more races.

There were 47 households, out of which 42.6% had children under the age of 18 living with them, 70.2% were married couples living together, 4.3% had a female householder with no husband present, and 23.4% were non-families. 19.1% of all households were made up of individuals, and 4.3% had someone living alone who was 65 years of age or older. The average household size was 2.72 and the average family size was 3.17.

In the city, the population was spread out, with 30.5% under the age of 18, 3.9% from 18 to 24, 32.0% from 25 to 44, 21.1% from 45 to 64, and 12.5% who were 65 years of age or older. The median age was 38 years. For every 100 females, there were 91.0 males. For every 100 females age 18 and over, there were 97.8 males.

The median income for a household in the city was $43,750, and the median income for a family was $45,625. Males had a median income of $29,000 versus $26,667 for females. The per capita income for the city was $16,080. There were 4.9% of families and 5.6% of the population living below the poverty line, including 7.9% of under eighteens and none of those over 64.

Arts and culture

Rodeo
Abbyville hosts the annual Abbyville Frontier Days PRCA Rodeo and BBQ the third weekend of May. Current events of the rodeo include barrel racing, mutton bustin', bull riding, calf roping, steer wrestling, and other special events. It is now a PRCA sanctioned event.

Clifford "Pinky" Busick was the creator of this rodeo, starting with a loan of $10 from his father. The first rodeo was a celebration of the Kansas Centennial, and it was held on July 15, 1961. The events at this initial celebration included a bonnet contest, beard contest, antique display, horse show, carnival, and bean dinner. Oklahoma! was performed in the evening as the main entertainment. The event was such a great success for Abbyville that Pinky worked to continue the rodeo as an annual event.

The second rodeo was held on the third weekend of May in 1963, and it has continued yearly ever since. Locals, both from Abbyville and from nearby towns, ran every aspect of the rodeo and took great pride in it. Many traditions of the early rodeos still continue today, including a Saturday morning parade, ham and chicken noodle lunch, and a BBQ dinner with fresh pie for dessert. Two 5- or 6-year-old children are crowned "Miss Little Britches" and "Uncle Sam" in the parade.

Despite Abbyville being such a small town, the rodeo has continued to this day, and it has kept Abbyville on the map.

Hollerado filmed the official music video for their single "Good Day at the Races" at the Abbyville rodeo grounds.

Education
The community is served by Fairfield USD 310 public school district.  Before the creation of USD 310, the old Abbyville High School mascot was the Lions.

References

Further reading

External links

 Abbyville - Directory of Public Officials
 Abbyville city map, KDOT

Cities in Kansas
Cities in Reno County, Kansas
1886 establishments in Kansas
Populated places established in 1886